Semperoncis is a genus of air-breathing sea slugs, a shell-less marine pulmonate gastropod mollusks in the family Onchidiidae.

Species
According to the World Register of Marine Species (WoRMS), the following species with a valid name are included within the genus Semperoncis:
 Semperoncis glabra (Semper, 1885)
 Semperoncis huberti (Labbé, 1934) (nomen dubium)
 Semperoncis montana (Plate, 1893)

References

 Dayrat, B. (2009) Review of the current knowledge of the systematics of Onchidiidae (Mollusca: Gastropoda: Pulmonata) with a checklist of nominal species. Zootaxa 2068: 1-26

Onchidiidae